John Sargent Pillsbury (July 29, 1827 – October 18, 1901) was an American politician, businessman, and philanthropist. A Republican, he served as the eighth Governor of Minnesota from 1876 to 1882. He was a co-founder of the Pillsbury Company.

Early life
Pillsbury was born in Sutton, New Hampshire, of English descent, the son of John and Susan (Wadleigh) Pillsbury. He was a descendant of William Pillsbury, who emigrated from England to Newburyport, Massachusetts, in 1640. In 1851, he opened a store in Warner, New Hampshire, partnering with Walter Harriman, a future Governor of New Hampshire and Civil War general.

Career

Pillsbury Company
Pillsbury came to Minnesota from New Hampshire in 1855 and settled in St. Anthony (now part of Minneapolis). The entrepreneur tried his hand at several different types of businesses including hardware, real estate, and lumber, though his greatest success came when he co-founded C. A. Pillsbury and Company along with his nephew Charles Alfred Pillsbury, for whom the company was named.

Political career
After the American Civil War, Pillsbury was elected as a third class companion of the Military Order of the Loyal Legion of the United States.

Pillsbury served in the Minnesota Senate for several years before becoming the eighth Governor of Minnesota. He served as governor from January 7, 1876, until January 10, 1882. During the Grasshopper Plague of 1877, Governor Pillsbury called for a day of prayer on April 26, 1877. A subsequent sleet storm killed all the grasshoppers. In Cold Spring, Minnesota, a chapel was built to honor the miracle.

Philanthropist
Pillsbury was a noted philanthropist and often anonymously donated funds to causes he favored. In particular, he helped the University of Minnesota recover from debt in its early years, and later served as a regent. Since then, he has become known as "The Father of the University." Pillsbury Hall at the University of Minnesota is named in his honor.

Personal life
Pillsbury married Mahala Fisk on November 3, 1856. He and Mahala had four children, daughters Addie, Susan May, and Sarah Belle, and then son Alfred. Addie married Charles M. Webster, but died at the age of 25; Susan married Frederic Beal Snyder and died at the age of 28; Sarah Belle married Edward C. Gale, an area lawyer and son of the area's first real estate developer, Samuel Chester Gale. Edward Gale was also an art collector and contributed to the Minneapolis Institute of Arts (MIA) as well. Alfred did not go into business, but instead became an art collector. When he died in 1950, the works were donated to MIA.

His daughter's Susan's only son, John Pillsbury Snyder (1888 –1959), was a survivor of the RMS Titanic in 1912. John and his wife, Nelle, returning from their European honeymoon, are said to have been the first people to have entered the very first lifeboat, No. 7.

Pillsbury died on October 18, 1901 and is interred in Lakewood Cemetery in Minneapolis, Minnesota. He is featured on a New Hampshire historical marker (number 44) along New Hampshire Route 114 in Sutton.

Quote

A 1901 magazine article described him as follows:

References

Further reading
Sturdevant, Lori (2011). The Pillsburys of Minnesota. Minneapolis:  Nodine Press.  .

External links
 
Biographical information and his  gubernatorial records are available for research use at the Minnesota Historical Society.
John Sargent Pillsbury in MNopedia, the Minnesota Encyclopedia
The Washburn-Fair Oaks Historic District: History and Walking Tour. Hennepin History Museum.
Pillsbury Hall (University of Minnesota Geology Department).
Minnesota Legislators Past and Present
John Sargeant Pillsbury bio at the National Governors Association

  	

1827 births
1901 deaths
People from Sutton, New Hampshire
Republican Party governors of Minnesota
University of Minnesota people
Republican Party Minnesota state senators
American Congregationalists
American people of English descent
Burials at Lakewood Cemetery
Pillsbury family
19th-century American politicians